Eivind Sværen (23 December 1917 – 5 January 1986) was a Norwegian shot putter. He represented the club Torshaug IF.
 
He finished seventh at the 1946 European Championships with a throw of 14.34 metres. He never participated in the Summer Olympics. He never became Norwegian champion, but his career was interrupted by World War II in Norway 1940-1945.

His career best throw was 14.90 metres, achieved in July 1947 in Bergen.

References

1917 births
1986 deaths
Norwegian male shot putters